Coleophora numeniella is a moth of the family Coleophoridae. It is found in southern Russia.

References

numeniella
Moths described in 1988
Moths of Europe